Benjamin Ryder Youngs (born 5 September 1989) is an English professional rugby union player who plays as a scrum-half for Leicester Tigers and . He made his club debut at 17 in 2007 and in 2010 made his debut for England; in 2022 he became England men’s most capped player with 115 appearances.  He started the 2019 Rugby World Cup Final and toured Australia with the Lions in 2013.

Youngs has been a Premiership Rugby champion five times, winning in 2007, 2009, 2010, 2013 and in 2022.

Early life and personal life
Youngs was born 5 September 1989 in Aylsham, Norfolk, England. His older brother Tom Youngs is also a rugby player, for Leicester Tigers as a hooker. His father Nick Youngs played scrum-half for both Leicester and England.

Youngs is married to Charlotte. They have two children, son Boris and daughter Billie.

Club career
Youngs made his Leicester Tigers first team début on 11 February 2007 in a friendly match against Argentina at Welford Road, the match marked Graham Rowntree's final Leicester appearance. On 24 April 2007 at the age of 17 years and 231 days he became Leicester's youngest ever player used in a league match when he came off the bench against Bristol. Later that season, he played in the final of the 2006–07 Guinness Premiership.

Youngs played 10 games for Leicester in the 2007–08 season, principally whilst Harry Ellis was injured.  Despite starting only 2 games, but featuring in 17, Youngs finished third in the 2008–09 Guinness Premiership Discovery of the Season award and won the club's player's young player of the year award.

Youngs was instrumental in Leicester's 22–17 defeat of the Springboks in a tour match on 6 November 2009 kicking 17 points. He was able to establish himself as first choice in 2009–10 season starting 23 games. In February 2010, Youngs signed a new contract. His teammates voted him Leicester Tigers Player of the Season for 2009/10. In a season littered with awards, he also picked up the Landrover Discovery of the Season award. He crowned off the season by playing in the 2009–10 Guinness Premiership final victory over Saracens, scoring a try in the process.

Youngs has also played in losing Premiership finals in 2011 and 2012, as well as starting in the 2013 final where Leicester defeated Northampton to seal their 10th English championship.

On 8 April 2017 in a game against Bath at Twickenham Youngs made his 200th appearance for Leicester. Following Leicester's home game with Newcastle Youngs was presented with an engraved silver picture frame in recognition of the feat. Youngs made his 250th appearance for Leicester Tigers on 13 September 2020 in a match against Northampton Saints played at an empty Welford Road Stadium due to the COVID-19 pandemic, Youngs scored a try in a 28–24 win for Leicester.

Youngs played as a replacement in the 2022 Premiership Rugby final as Tigers beat Saracens 15-12.

International career

England

Youngs has played for England U-16, U-18 and in March 2008 was a member of the England under-20 team that won the grand slam. Later that month, Youngs made his debut for the England Sevens team at the Hong Kong sevens. Youngs played in the final of both the 2008 IRB Junior World Championship. and 2009 IRB Junior World Championship. He was selected for the revised England Saxons Squad on 13 January 2010, and upgraded to the revised Senior Squad as injury cover for Harry Ellis on 25 January 2010. Later that month, he made his debut for the England Saxons, against Ireland A.

Youngs made his senior England debut as a substitute on the wing for the injured Ugo Monye in the Calcutta Cup match against  on 13 March 2010, and was an unused replacement in the match against . He continued as part of the senior squad on their tour of Australia, and played in both Test matches.

He played an important role in improving the England gameplan in the game, and scored a solo try in the first half. On 13 November 2010, Youngs was awarded man of the match award for his outstanding performance against Australia. Youngs continued to be a steadfast member of the England squad, including call ups for the 2011, 2015 and 2019 Rugby World Cups.

After Eddie Jones replaced Stuart Lancaster as England head coach after the 2015 RWC, Youngs continued to play a crucial role in the England squad, being one of two ever-present scrum-halves, along with Danny Care. Youngs played in all but one (vs Uruguay) of England's record-equaling run of 18 consecutive wins, starting 15 of them.

This run included the 2016 Grand Slam achieved through a win against the French in Paris, avenging the defeat to Ireland in a match of similar importance in 2011, in addition to being part of the side that secured a 3-0 series triumph against Australia only a couple of months after the tournament ended. Later in the year, he put in some of his most memorable performances against South Africa and again against Australia in that year's Autumn Internationals, scoring and assisting several tries using his trademark show-and-go off the base of a ruck.

Youngs was part of further Six Nations victories in 2017 and 2020, scoring two tries in the 2020 title decider against Italy to mark his 100th cap in style. Youngs is only the second Englishman to reach this number after Jason Leonard, and immediately went on to win a further four caps in the inaugural Amazon Autumn Nations Cup  as England secured their second piece of silverware of the year. Youngs has said that the enforced break from rugby due to the Coronavirus crisis left him refreshed and recharged, and has stated his aim is to be a part of the England team for the 2023 World Cup in France, which would mark his fourth such tournament having been a part of the 2011, 2015 and 2019 squads.

As of 26 February 2022, Youngs became England's most capped international player, surpassing Jason Leonard's record of 114 caps.

British & Irish Lions

In April 2013, Youngs was announced as one of three scrum-halves for the 2013 British & Irish Lions tour to Australia alongside Mike Phillips and Conor Murray. He made 2 capped appearances, off the bench for the first test in Brisbane, and then starting the second test in Melbourne alongside his brother Tom Youngs. He also made uncapped appearances against 5 provincial sides, scoring 2 tries.

Youngs was again selected as one of the three scrum-halves in April 2017 for the 2017 British & Irish Lions tour to New Zealand, alongside previous tourist Conor Murray and newcomer Rhys Webb, with Leicester Tigers teammate Dan Cole also being selected again. However, on 6 May 2017, Youngs withdrew himself from the tour party due to family reasons and was replaced by Scotland international Greig Laidlaw.

International tries

References

External links

Official Website
RFU Profile
Leicester Tigers Profile

1989 births
Living people
English rugby union players
Rugby union players from Norwich
Leicester Tigers players
Rugby union scrum-halves
People educated at Gresham's School
England international rugby union players
British & Irish Lions rugby union players from England